The Florida Senate Majority Office is the political extension of the Florida Senate president. The Senate Majority Office consists of the majority leader, who represents the members of the majority party in the Senate, as well as a team of professional staff. The majority leader is assisted in this role by a deputy majority leader and majority whips, whose job is to enforce party discipline on votes deemed to be crucial.

The Florida Senate majority leader is elected by Florida State senators in the political party holding the largest number of seats in the Senate. Since 1996, Republicans have held the majority in the Florida Senate. While the responsibilities vary depending upon the political climate, the Florida Senate majority leader is responsible for political activities, enabling the caucus to fully participate in the governmental process.

See also
Florida Democratic Party
Florida Legislature
Florida Senate
Florida State Capitol
Government of Florida
Republican Party of Florida

References

External links 
Florida Senate Majority Office

Florida Legislature
Florida Senate
Government of Florida